HMS Richmond is a Type 23 frigate of the Royal Navy. She was launched on 6 April 1993 by Lady Hill-Norton, wife of the late Admiral of the Fleet The Lord Hill-Norton, and was the last warship to be built by Swan Hunter Shipbuilders. She sailed from the builders on the River Tyne in November 1994. She is named for the Dukedom of Richmond.

Operational history

1995–2000

Richmond was first deployed in 1997 to the Far East as part of the 'Ocean Wave 97' Task Group. One of the most interesting visits she made was to the Russian port of Vladivostok, an important Russian naval base, where she became the first Royal Navy vessel to visit in over 100 years. Also that year Richmond escorted the royal yacht  on the ship's final leg of her final tour of the United Kingdom prior to her decommissioning.

In 1998 Richmond participated in two significant NATO naval exercises and arrived in New York where she was involved in the US Navy Fleet Week. In 1999 Richmond was dispatched to the South Atlantic as part of Atlantic Patrol Task (South) and underwent a major overhaul which concluded in 2000.

2001–2010
In 2001 Richmond joined the NATO multi-national squadron Standing Naval Force Mediterranean. In 2002 she arrived in the Caribbean where she performed tasks including obligatory "fly-the-flag" duties to the Commonwealth countries in the region as well as undergoing trials. In June 2002, two officers were killed when Richmonds Lynx helicopter crashed off the coast of Virginia.

In 2003 she deployed to the Persian Gulf on Armilla Patrol where she relieved . She had arrived shortly before the 2003 Iraq War. Richmond remained in the region at the war's end and returned home in August.

In July 2004 Richmond deployed on Atlantic Patrol Task (North), which encompasses the Atlantic and Caribbean regions. Two of the ports she visited early in the deployment were Jamaica and Belize. In September Richmond came to the assistance of the Turks and Caicos Islands when they were struck by Hurricane Frances.  Turks and Caicos suffered only minimal damage to buildings. Richmond then sailed to Curaçao, Netherlands Antilles where she resumed her maintenance period, which had been interrupted due to the hurricane, but remained on standby to provide assistance due to the imminent arrival of Hurricane Ivan.

Hurricane Ivan eventually hit the region, causing significant damage and fatalities, particularly inflicting enormous damage and a number of fatalities to Grenada, which included immense damage to the capital St. George's. Richmond and her accompanying Royal Fleet Auxiliary vessel  came to the assistance of the island. The extent of the damage in Grenada reached such levels that Keith Mitchell, Prime Minister of Grenada, was forced to relocate to Richmond after his residence was destroyed by the hurricane. The Prime Minister effectively ran his country from Richmond for several hours.

Her crew having performed vital assistance on land at Grenada, Richmond steamed at her top speed for Jamaica and the Cayman Islands to assist those territories in recovering from the ravages of Hurricane Ivan.

Richmond returned from her deployment in December 2004, and began a refit period at HM Naval Base Portsmouth in mid-2005. The refit, undertaken by Fleet Support Limited, was completed in late 2006 and Richmond was returned to the operational fleet in October 2006. With 44 major upgrades to her sensor and weapon systems, Richmond was at that time one of the most capable Type 23 frigates. From 5 to 12 July 2010 she anchored beside  in London to foster the ship's relations with the Borough of Richmond-upon-Thames.

2011–present

In 2011, she deployed to the Middle East and the Asia-Pacific region, the latter for upcoming Five Power Defence Arrangement exercises, specifically Exercise Bersama Shield 11. She assisted with anti-piracy operations with the EU Naval Force and was also a participant in the IMEX Asia 2011. After Singapore, she rendered honours to the fallen of Force Z (see the Sinking of Prince of Wales and Repulse).

She took part in exercise FRUKUS 2011 with ships from the United States Navy and Russian Navy.

In early August 2013, she deployed under the command of Commander Robert G. Pedre to be the ship for the Royal Navy's Atlantic Patrol South where she carried out Maritime Security Patrols in the Falkland Islands. HMS Richmond returned to the UK in February 2014. This deployment involved high-profile defence engagement visits to five continents and resulted in the ship receiving Commander British Forces South Atlantic Islands Commendation for Distinguished Service.  Of note, during her seven months away Richmond conducted visits to five British Dependent Overseas Territories including Ascension Island, St Helena, the Falklands, South Georgia and Tristan da Cunha. During this deployment Richmond became the first Royal Navy warship to transit the Panama Canal in its centenary year.

In October 2015 Richmond was deployed to the Mediterranean to aid the EU's fight against people smugglers due to refugees fleeing civil war in Syria. She returned to her home port on 11 December 2015.

In October 2016 Richmond and the destroyer  were dispatched by the Ministry of Defence to intercept and "man-mark" a fleet of Russian Navy vessels, including their flagship  passing through the English Channel on their way to Syria.

On 6 January 2017, Richmond featured in Series 1, episode 9 of The Grand Tour. The ship and its weaponry star in a sequence where James May and Jeremy Clarkson commandeer its 4.5-inch Mark 8 naval gun to destroy an armoured vehicle manufactured by Richard Hammond. In June 2017, Richmond docked at Chatham on the Medway to mark 350 years since the Raid on the Medway.

Richmond entered refit at Devonport in the late summer of 2017. In November it was announced that on completion of the work in 2018 she will not return to Portsmouth and will switch base port to Plymouth in an effort to concentrate the Type 23s fitted with anti-submarine equipment in the city. The refit saw the ship become the first Type 23 to be fitted with MTU M53B diesel generators - these will be fitted to the remainder of the class (except  and ), as well as the Type 26. In February 2020, Richmond went to sea to for post-refit tests. These included the new PGMU propulsion system (MTU M53B generators) and the new Sea Ceptor air defence system, replacing the 1970s Sea Wolf system.

The ship deployed as part of United Kingdom Carrier Strike Group 21, alongside sister ship , travelling from the UK to Gibraltar, the Suez Canal, and the South China Sea in 2021.

Affiliations
 His Grace, The Duke of Richmond and Gordon
 The Yorkshire Regiment (14th/15th, 19th and 33rd/76th Foot)
 Worshipful Company of Basketmakers
 Town of Richmond
 Richmond upon Thames
 London Nautical School

See also 
 HMS Richmond helicopter crash

References

External links

 

 

Frigates of the United Kingdom
Ships built by Swan Hunter
Ships built on the River Tyne
1993 ships
Type 23 frigates of the Royal Navy